The Japanese Friendship Garden is a Japanese stroll garden located in Phoenix, Arizona. The garden encompasses  and includes a tea garden and tea house. It is a joint project of the sister cities of Phoenix, Arizona, and Himeji, Japan. The Japanese name is Rohō-en (鷺鳳園).

In 2004 it was named by the City of Phoenix as one of the Phoenix Points of Pride.

Name 

The Japanese name for the garden, Rohō-en, is a combination of three Japanese words. Ro means Heron, a bird symbol of Himeji City. Shirasagi-jō, or the White Heron Castle, is a 300-year-old medieval castle in Himeji. Hō is the Japanese word for the mythical Phoenix bird Fenghuang. En means garden.

History 
Himeji, Japan became a Phoenix Sister City in November 1976 and is one of Phoenix's ten Sister Cities around the globe. Phoenix and Himeji participate in business, governmental, cultural and educational exchanges that promote international goodwill and understanding. The Garden is the shared cultural vision of the cities of Phoenix and Himeji. The Japanese Friendship Garden is a 501(c)3 non-profit organization in partnership with the City of Phoenix Parks and Recreation Department and our Sister City of Himeji, Japan.

Landscape architects from Himeji, Japan have made 60 trips to Phoenix and City of Phoenix delegations made five trips to Himeji since 1987. Overall, more than 50 architects from Himeji contributed to the project. The construction cost is estimated at $3.8 million by bond funds and $1.0 million by private donations.

The first phase of the garden opened in November 1996. The rest of it opened to the public in 2002.

Sister Garden relationship
In April, 2017, Rohō-en signed a sister garden affiliation with Kōko-en, in Himeji. The two gardens will actively promote each other's garden from now on.

Features 

The garden features more than 1,500 tons of hand picked rock, stone footbridges, lanterns and more than 50 varieties of plants. It includes streams, a 12-foot waterfall, and a Koi pond with over 300 Koi fish. One of the main attractions at the Japanese Friendship Garden is the Japanese Tea House. 3.5 total acres with a koi pond that is 5/8 of an acre.

The Garden showcases more than 50 varieties of plants including two varieties of bamboo. The designers chose plant species that can withstand the rigors of a desert environment while still reflecting the serenity of a Japanese Garden. 1,500 tons of rock handpicked from quarries near Jerome, Superior, Congress and Florence line the stream beds, walking paths, lake shore and main lake waterfall.

See also 

 List of historic properties in Phoenix, Arizona

References

External links 

 The Japanese Friendship Garden of Phoenix – Official page
 Facebook page

Asian-American culture in Arizona
Phoenix Points of Pride
Japanese gardens in the United States
Gardens in Arizona
Parks in Phoenix, Arizona